Bellis dubia is a flowering plant in the family Asteraceae and is in the genus Bellis.

References

dubia